Mohamed Al-Bouhairi (born 4 April 1952) is a Saudi Arabian athlete. He competed in the men's triple jump at the 1976 Summer Olympics.

References

1952 births
Living people
Athletes (track and field) at the 1976 Summer Olympics
Saudi Arabian male triple jumpers
Olympic athletes of Saudi Arabia
Place of birth missing (living people)